Reed Arena is a sports arena and entertainment venue located at the corner of Olsen Boulevard and Kimbrough Boulevard in College Station, Texas. This facility is used for Texas A&M University basketball games and commencement ceremonies, concerts, trade shows, family entertainment, and Texas A&M student programs, including the on-campus Aggie Muster. The building replaced the G. Rollie White Coliseum, and is named for Dr. & Mrs. Chester J. Reed, a 1947 A&M graduate whose donations made the new arena possible.

In 2005, Reed Arena served as the site of men's and women's first round NIT games, as the men played Clemson and the women played Tulsa.

In recent years, Reed Arena has gained a reputation as one of the most hostile arenas in the nation, coinciding with the men's and women's Aggie basketball teams' rise to national prominence.  This is partly due to a group of students calling themselves the Reed Rowdies, which have been instrumental in helping to create an energetic fan atmosphere during basketball games similar to that of football games at Kyle Field.

Facilities
Reed Arena first opened its doors in 1998 as a member of Texas A&M Special Event Facilities.  The arena was named after its primary donor Chester J. Reed, Texas A&M Class of 1947. The building hosts many official functions for Texas A&M University.  With enough indoor seating capacity for 12,500 guests, the arena makes an ideal location for the university's graduation ceremonies, freshmen convocation, and Aggie Muster ceremonies.  The main purpose behind building the arena was to house the Texas A&M's men's and women's basketball teams.  However, unlike all the other athletic facilities on campus, Reed Arena operates under the Department of Finance, not the Athletic Department.

While in the planning stages, Chester Reed donated an operations endowment to help run the building during its first five years.  However, due to initial over-estimating of revenue and budget shortfalls during construction, this endowment was unable to make the arena become self-sufficient.  For all of these reasons mentioned above, Reed Arena cannot just focus on basketball and other university events.  As a necessary function, the Arena has developed pipelines of support from a multitude of different stakeholders and events that operate both within the local community and internationally.  In its many years of operation, Reed Arena has hosted a wide variety of famous performers including Bill Cosby, Garth Brooks, The Dixie Chicks, as well as the performers of WWE, Cirque du Soleil, and Ringling Brothers and Barnum & Bailey Circus.

The $36 million Reed Arena was designed by the Houston firm Lockwood, Andrews, and Newman, Inc. and built in 1998 by Dallas-based Huber, Hunt and Nichols, Inc. The arena has seats for 12,989 fans, while an additional 2,000 people can be accommodated on the main floor for concerts.

Reed Arena is able to provide group accommodations on many different levels.  Events can greatly vary in size; the Arena can accommodate an event involving thousands of patrons or a small meeting that contains only 15 participants on any given day.  The arena floor contains  of column-free space, large enough to accommodate 150 exhibit booths or a 1,800 seat banquet.  This figure almost doubles the space any other building in the Bryan/College Station area.  The second floor contains four  rooms, which can be used to accommodate smaller events.  The lower level of the arena also contains a  multi-purpose room, a full-service commercial kitchen, and numerous types of dressing rooms.

The arena is surrounded by four parking lots, which hold a combined 1500 cars, and is also within walking distance of a 3,750 capacity parking garage and numerous other parking lots. Generally event parking costs between $5.

Cox-McFerrin Center
In February 2006, the 12th Man Foundation, a fund raising organization associated with Texas A&M Athletics, announced plans for an effort to build the Cox-McFerrin Center, a  addition to Reed Arena, providing new men's and women's basketball locker rooms, practice gyms, and player lounges.

Attendance records

12 largest men's basketball crowds:

See also
 List of NCAA Division I basketball arenas

References

External links
 Reed Arena
 Reed Arena Event Search
 Reed Arena at 12thman.com
 Reed Rowdies
 Cox-McFerrin Center ground breaking announcement

Indoor arenas in Texas
Basketball venues in Texas
College basketball venues in the United States
Texas A&M Aggies basketball
Convention centers in Texas
Sports venues in College Station, Texas
Volleyball venues in Texas